Vincenzo Sabbatini (died 1526) was a Roman Catholic prelate who served as Bishop of Vulturara e Montecorvino (1519–1526).

Biography
On 9 Sep 1519, Vincenzo Sabbatini was appointed during the papacy of Pope Leo X as Bishop of Vulturara e Montecorvino. He served as Bishop of Vulturara e Montecorvino until his death in 1526.

References

External links and additional sources 
 (for Chronology of Bishops) 
 (for Chronology of Bishops) 

16th-century Italian Roman Catholic bishops
1526 deaths
Bishops appointed by Pope Leo X